The Logie Award for Most Popular Panel or Current Affairs Program is an award which is presented at the Australian TV Week Logie Awards. It is given to recognise the popularity of an Australian news panel discussion or current affairs television show.

The award was first presented at the 22nd Annual TV Week Logie Awards held in 1980 as the Logie for Most Popular Public Affairs Program. It was eliminated as a category in 1999 but reintroduced in 2000, until it was eliminated again in 2013. For the 58th Annual TV Week Logie Awards ceremony held in 2016, the category was reintroduced as the Logie Award for Best News Panel or a Current Affairs Program and it was also awarded in 2017 before being eliminated in 2018. It returned in 2019 as the Logie Award for Most Popular Panel or Current Affairs Program.

Winners and nominees

Listed below are the winners of the award for each year, as well as the other nominees as Most Popular Public Affairs Program.

Listed below are the winners of the award for each year, as well as the other nominees for Logie for Best News Panel or a Current Affairs Program.

References

Awards established in 1980